Mlinište is a village located in the municipality of Zažablje, in Dubrovnik-Neretva County, Croatia.

References 

Populated places in Dubrovnik-Neretva County